Maple River Senior High School is a high school in Mapleton, Minnesota, United States. The school's mascot is an eagle and the school is a member of the Minnesota State High School League.

References

External links
 

Public high schools in Minnesota
Schools in Blue Earth County, Minnesota